Isaac "Bougie" Herzog (born 22 September 1960) is an Israeli politician who has been serving as the 11th president of Israel since 2021. He is the first president to be born in Israel after its Declaration of Independence.

Son of former Israeli president Chaim Herzog, he is a lawyer by profession and had served as Government Secretary from 1999 to 2001. He was a member of the Knesset from 2003 to 2018. He has held several ministerial posts between 2005 and 2011, including serving as Minister of Welfare and Social Services from 2007 to 2011 under prime ministers Ehud Olmert and Benjamin Netanyahu.

He had also served as Chairman of the Labor Party and the Zionist Union alliance from 2013 to 2017. He served as Leader of the Opposition from 2013 to 2018 and was the Labor Party candidate for prime minister during the 2015 legislative election.

He was elected in the 2021 presidential election and was inaugurated on 7 July 2021. He is the first son of an Israeli president to become president himself.

Early life and education
Isaac (Yitzhak) Herzog, aka "Bougie", was born in Tel Aviv. He is the son of General Chaim Herzog, who served two terms as the Sixth President of Israel from 1983 to 1993, and Aura Ambache, founder of the Council for a Beautiful Israel. Herzog's father was born in Ireland and his mother was born in Egypt; their families were of Eastern European Jewish descent (from Poland, Russia, and Lithuania). He has two brothers and a sister. His paternal grandfather, Rabbi Yitzhak HaLevi Herzog, was the first Chief Rabbi of Ireland from 1922 to 1935 and Ashkenazi Chief Rabbi of Israel from 1936 to 1959. The third foreign minister of Israel, Abba Eban, was his uncle.

When his father served as permanent representative of Israel to the United Nations for three years, Herzog lived in New York City and attended the Ramaz School. In the following years, while also studying in high school, Herzog gained an advanced academic education at Cornell University and New York University and spent summers at Camp Ramah. He also accompanied his father to visit the Lubavitcher Rebbe in Brooklyn.

When he returned to Israel at the end of 1978, he enlisted in the Israel Defense Forces and served as a major officer in Unit 8200 of the Israeli Intelligence Corps.

Herzog studied law at Tel Aviv University. He worked at a law firm founded by his father, Herzog, Fox & Ne'eman.

Career
Although he did not win a seat in the 1999 elections, Herzog served as the secretary of the government in Ehud Barak's cabinet until 2001 when Barak was defeated by Ariel Sharon in a special election for prime minister. In 1999, he was also investigated in the "Amutot Barak" scandal (a scandal involving allegations that the party funding law was violated), but maintained his silence. The Attorney General, therefore, decided to close the case against him due to lack of evidence. From 2000 until 2003, he served as chairman of the Israel Anti-Drug Authority.

Herzog won a seat in the 2003 election as a member of the Labor Party, and was appointed Minister of Housing and Construction at his request when Labor joined Ariel Sharon's coalition government on 10 January 2005. However, on 23 November 2005, he resigned from his cabinet post along with the rest of the party. Prior to the 2006 elections, Herzog won second place on Labor's list in the party's primaries. He was initially appointed Minister of Tourism in Ehud Olmert's Kadima-led coalition, but was reassigned to the Social Affairs ministry in March 2007 after Yisrael Beiteinu was awarded the Tourism Ministry following their late entry to the governing coalition, and was also appointed Minister of the Diaspora, Society and the Fight Against Antisemitism. He was again second on the party's list for the 2009 elections. Following the election, he was appointed Minister of Welfare and Social Services and Minister of the Diaspora. In January 2009 he was appointed by PM Ehud Olmert as the Israel Government Coordinator for the provision of humanitarian aid to the population of Gaza. He later resigned from the cabinet after Ehud Barak left the Labor Party to establish Independence in January 2011.

In 2011 Herzog was an unsuccessful candidate for the Labor Party leadership. He finished third in the primaries that year after Shelly Yachimovich and Amir Peretz.

Opposition leader
On 22 November 2013 Herzog was elected leader of the Labor Party, defeating incumbent Shelly Yachimovich by 58.5% to 41.5%. In doing so, he became Leader of the Opposition. Whereas Yachimovich focused first on socioeconomic issues, Herzog prioritizes security and resolution of the Israeli–Palestinian conflict.

Ten days after the election, Herzog met with Palestinian President Mahmoud Abbas to pledge his support for the two-state solution.

Herzog reportedly reached out to Shas leader Aryeh Deri to increase cooperation between the two opposition factions.

In June 2014, Herzog criticized PM Benjamin Netanyahu for failing to engage the international community, failing to present a proposal for peace with Palestinians, and failure to work effectively with the President of the United States, Barack Obama. Herzog declared that Netanyahu's "loathing and hostility for Barack Obama" was one of his greatest failures, since it put Israel's security at risk.

With the governing coalition dissolving and new elections expected in March 2015, Herzog called on Hatnua and Kadima parties to join his Labor Party in forming a new coalition. In an interview with Ynet, he stated, "I am capable of replacing Netanyahu. I will do everything in order to establish a bloc before the elections." Shortly thereafter, Herzog and Tzipi Livni, who was justice minister and is head of a centrist faction, announced they would campaign on a joint slate in the upcoming election in an effort to keep Netanyahu, leader of the Likud Party, from securing a fourth term as prime minister. The joint list was named Zionist Union, winning 24 seats to Likud's 30 in the 2015 election, making it the largest Opposition faction.

In July 2017, Herzog was eliminated in the first round of the Labor party primaries. Avi Gabbay went on to win the leadership elections; however, Herzog remained official leader of the opposition in the Knesset as Gabay was not an elected MK. After being elected chairman of the Jewish Agency for Israel, Herzog resigned as Leader of the Opposition and from the Knesset. Tzipi Livni succeeded him as Leader of the Opposition, whilst Robert Tiviaev replaced him in the Knesset.

Chairman of the Jewish Agency 
In June 2018 Herzog was unanimously elected chairman of the Jewish Agency for Israel. Herzog marked bridging the gap between the Jewish people and the State of Israel as one of his objectives. In an interview on Ynet news, Herzog stated that he views intermarriage between Jews and non-Jews as a plague to which there must be a solution. On October 24, 2018, Herzog led a resolution to reaffirm the Jewish Agency's Board of Governors' commitment to the principles of a democratic Israel as emerging from the Declaration of Independence.

Following the Pittsburgh synagogue shooting, Herzog expressed his concern from the rising anti-Semitism all over the world. In the International Holocaust Remembrance Day ceremony at the European Parliament in Brussels he urged the leaders of European countries to fight anti-Semitism and to adopt the International Holocaust Remembrance Alliance's definition of anti-Semitism. In March 2019 the Jewish Agency became the first public institution in Israel to help employees finance surrogacy services abroad so that they can become parents (this includes gay and single parents).

President of Israel 

On 19 May 2021, Herzog announced his candidacy in the 2021 Israeli presidential election. On 2 June 2021, he was elected as president by the Knesset. He won more votes than any presidential candidate in Israel's history, receiving 87 votes compared to 26 for his opponent Miriam Peretz, and was sworn in on 7 July 2021, becoming the first son of a former Israeli president to also become president.

In his inaugural speech as President of the State of Israel, on 7 July 2022, Herzog called for the healing of rifts in Israeli society and the building of bridges within Israel and between Israel and the Jewish Diaspora. Herzog said: “We must remember that it was baseless hatred that led to the destruction of the First and Second Temples. The same baseless hatred, the same factionalism and polarization that claim such a heavy price from us—nowadays, and every day. The heaviest price of all is the erosion of our national resilience.” Herzog also emphasized the importance of confronting the climate crisis.

Since entering the Israeli presidency, Herzog has conducted a number of major state visits. On 30 January 2022, Herzog conducted a historic state visit to the United Arab Emirates. In March 2022, Herzog embarked on a regional tour of neighboring Mediterranean states, taking in Greece, Cyprus, and a state visit to Turkey together with the First Lady, as the guests of President Recep Tayyip Erdoğan and his wife Emine. Following months of dialogue since Herzog’s election as president, the presidents met for a summit at the Presidential Complex in Ankara, symbolizing their countries’ desire to move on from a period of tense relations. During the visit, Herzog addressed the “baggage of the past,” which he said “never disappears of its own accord,” and underscored that the Israeli-Turkish relationship would be determined by both states’ actions. In the latter part of his Turkish visit, as part of a broader policy of strengthening relations with the Jewish Diaspora during foreign engagements, Herzog and his wife Michal visited the Istanbul Jewish community at the Neve Shalom Synagogue, the target of various terror attacks over the years.

On 29 March 2022, Herzog conducted a historic first public visit by an Israeli leader to Amman, Jordan, during which he met King Abdullah II, with whom he discussed to deepen the Israeli-Jordanian relationship, maintain regional stability, and bolster peace and normalization.

Further to his declared objective of embarking on a journey within Israeli society, and as part of his public engagements in Israel and visits to its diverse communities, on 29 October 2021 Herzog participated in a memorial for the victims of the 1956 Kafr Qasim Massacre and apologized on behalf of the State of Israel, making him the first Israeli official to ask for forgiveness at the official ceremony in Kafr Qasim. In his speech, Herzog said: “The killing and injury of innocents are absolutely forbidden. They must remain beyond all political arguments.”

In October 2021, Herzog announced the establishment of the Israeli Climate Forum under the auspices of the Office of the President, appointing former Member of Knesset Dov Khenin as the forum’s chairman. The forum oversees a number of working groups focusing on different issues and brings together public officials and private citizens to coordinate efforts to combat the climate crisis. In his “Renewable Middle East” speech, delivered at the Haaretz Climate Change Forum, Herzog spelled out a vision for how the climate crisis presented opportunities for regional cooperation across the Middle East and Mediterranean Basin. 

On 28 November 2021, Herzog lit candles for the first night of Chanukah at the Cave of the Patriarchs in Hebron, attracting left-wing criticism. Visiting Hebron, Herzog declared that recognition of the Jewish People’s historical attachments to Hebron “must be beyond all controversy.”

In December 2021, Herzog launched his “Think Good” campaign, with the objective of combating cyberbullying. The campaign, in collaboration with Meta, promoted respectful and inclusive discourse online.

Personal life 
Herzog is married to Michal, a lawyer, and has three sons. He resides in his childhood home in the Tzahala neighborhood of Tel Aviv.

References

External links

 

|-

|-

|-

|-

1960 births
Living people
20th-century Israeli lawyers
21st-century Israeli lawyers
Children of national leaders
Cornell University alumni
Government ministers of Israel
Isaac
Israeli Jews
Israeli Labor Party leaders
Israeli people of Egyptian-Jewish descent
Israeli people of Irish-Jewish descent
Israeli people of Lithuanian-Jewish descent
Israeli people of Polish-Jewish descent
Israeli people of Russian-Jewish descent
Jewish Israeli politicians
Leaders of the Opposition (Israel)
Levites
Members of the 16th Knesset (2003–2006)
Members of the 17th Knesset (2006–2009)
Members of the 18th Knesset (2009–2013)
Members of the 19th Knesset (2013–2015)
Members of the 20th Knesset (2015–2019)
Ministers of Tourism of Israel
New York University alumni
Politicians from Tel Aviv
Presidents of Israel
Ramaz School alumni
Tel Aviv University alumni
Zionist Union politicians
Heads of state of states with limited recognition
Lawyers from Tel Aviv